Standard Brands was a packaged foods company, formed in 1929 by J. P. Morgan & Co. with the merger of:

Fleischmann Company
Royal Baking Powder Company
E. W. Gillett Company of Canada (1929) - Toronto-based baking goods company (maker of Magic Baking Powder) founded by P. W. Gillett in 1852
Widlar Food Products Company
Chase & Sanborn Coffee Company

By 1940, it was the number-two brand of packaged goods after General Foods. By 1955 the company was listed as 75 in the Fortune 500.

Standard Brands made several acquisitions. It bought Planters in 1960, and the Curtiss Candy Company in 1964. In 1979, it acquired Inver House scotch.

Seagrams approached Standard Brands with the idea of a merger. The company merged with Nabisco in 1981 to form Nabisco Brands, Inc.

References

External links

Food manufacturers of the United States
Defunct companies based in New York (state)
Nabisco
Food and drink companies established in 1929

Food and drink companies disestablished in 1981
1981 mergers and acquisitions
1929 establishments in New York (state)
1981 disestablishments in New York (state)